James P. White may refer to:
 James P. White (writer), writer and executive director of the Christopher Isherwood Foundation
 James White (New Mexico politician), member of the New Mexico House of Representatives

See also
 James P. White House, Belfast, Maine